Douglas Byrd High School is a four-year public high school located in Fayetteville, North Carolina. Their mascot is the Eagle.

Notable alumni
 Dominic A. Antonelli  former NASA astronaut
 Brad Edwards  NFL defensive back and Super Bowl XXVI champion with the Washington Redskins
 Donvetis Franklin  Arena Football League player
 Joe Horn  NFL wide receiver and 4x Pro Bowl selection
 Calvin Lowry  NFL safety
 Ricky Shaw  NFL linebacker
 Kinnon Tatum  NFL linebacker
 Donnell Woolford  NFL cornerback, Pro Bowl selection in 1994, named to Chicago Bears 100 greatest players of all-time list

References

Education in Fayetteville, North Carolina
Educational institutions in the United States with year of establishment missing
Public high schools in North Carolina
Schools in Cumberland County, North Carolina